Freddy Brooks (born 10 August 1969) is a Cuban former volleyball player. He competed at the 1992 Summer Olympics and the 1996 Summer Olympics.

References

External links
 

1969 births
Living people
Cuban men's volleyball players
Iraklis V.C. players
Olympic volleyball players of Cuba
PAOK V.C. players
Volleyball players at the 1992 Summer Olympics
Volleyball players at the 1996 Summer Olympics
Sportspeople from Guantánamo
Pan American Games medalists in volleyball
Pan American Games gold medalists for Cuba
Pan American Games bronze medalists for Cuba
Medalists at the 1991 Pan American Games
Medalists at the 1995 Pan American Games
20th-century Cuban people
21st-century Cuban people